Hesperocamelus is an extinct genus of terrestrial herbivore in the family Camelidae, endemic to North America from the Miocene.

Taxonomy
Hesperocamelus was named by Macdonald (1949). It was assigned to Camelidae by Macdonald (1949) and Carroll (1988).

Fossil distribution
Fossil distribution is restricted to Nevada and California.

References

Prehistoric camelids
Miocene even-toed ungulates
Miocene mammals of North America
Miocene genera
Taxa named by Erwin Hinckley Barbour
Fossil taxa described in 1939
Prehistoric even-toed ungulate genera